Sreten Dragojlović (May 6, 1938 – September 2, 1971) was a Serbian basketball player and coach. He represented the Yugoslavia national basketball team internationally.

Playing career 
Dragojlović started his basketball career with his hometown team Sloga. After that, he came to Belgrade and spent most of his career in the Crvena zvezda of the Yugoslav Basketball League for which he played from 1957 to 1967. He was also brought there by the former Zvezda player Srđan Kalember. In 1960, he got five-month suspension after had got caught smuggling on the Poland tour. In the 1963 season, Dragojlović scored an excellent average of 28.2 points per game. He was the best club pointer that season while Vladimir Cvetković scored 25.5 points, and Ratomir Vićentić 18.9. Still, he did not manage to win a trophy with Zvezda. During 10 years with the Crvena zvezda, he played 155 matches and scored 2,437 points. The last match he played on July 23, 1967, against Borac.

National team career
As a player for the Yugoslavia national basketball team Dragojlović participated at the 1960 Summer Olympics in Rome and at the EuroBasket 1961 in Belgrade where he won a silver medal. Also, he won a gold medal at 1959 Mediterranean Games in Lebanon. He played 49 games for the national team from 1959 to 1961.

Post-playing career 
Dragojlović coached the Crvena zvezda women's team of the Yugoslav Women's Basketball League. He also worked at the Basketball Federation of Yugoslavia.

Personal life 
Dragojlović died in a traffic accident near Gornji Milanovac on September 2, 1971, when he was rushing to visit his sick father.

See also 
 List of KK Crvena zvezda players with 100 games played

References

External links
 Sreten Dragojlovic at sports-reference.com

1938 births
1971 deaths
Basketball players at the 1960 Summer Olympics
Competitors at the 1959 Mediterranean Games
KK Crvena zvezda players
KK Sloga players
ŽKK Crvena zvezda coaches
Mediterranean Games gold medalists for Yugoslavia
Road incident deaths in Yugoslavia
Road incident deaths in Serbia
Serbian men's basketball players
Serbian men's basketball coaches
Sportspeople from Kraljevo
Yugoslav men's basketball players
Yugoslav basketball coaches
Olympic basketball players of Yugoslavia
Mediterranean Games medalists in basketball
Shooting guards